ICHC may refer to:
I Can Has Cheezburger?, a weblog featuring lolcats
International Cycling History Conference, an annual event devoted to applying academic rigor to the history of bicycles and cycling
Independent Community and Health Concern, a political party in England
Indiana Collegiate Hockey Conference, United States, an ice hockey league